Darryl Marvin Carlton (May 24, 1953 – April 21, 1994) was a professional American football offensive tackle in the National Football League. He was a 1st round selection (23rd overall pick) in the 1975 NFL Draft out of the University of Tampa by the Miami Dolphins. He played for the Dolphins (1975–1976) and the Tampa Bay Buccaneers (1977–1979).

References

  

Darryl Carlton the NFL player (Big Meade) was Black, the picture presented is of the white Darryl Carlton.

1953 births
1994 deaths
American football offensive tackles
Miami Dolphins players
Tampa Bay Buccaneers players
Tampa Spartans football players
Sportspeople from Bartow, Florida
Players of American football from Florida